The 1973 NBA draft was the 27th annual draft of the National Basketball Association (NBA). The draft was held on April 24 and May 5, 1973, before the 1973–74 season. In this draft, 17 NBA teams took turns selecting amateur U.S. college basketball players and other eligible players, including international players. The first two picks in the draft belonged to the teams that finished last in each conference, with the order determined by a coin flip. The Philadelphia 76ers won the coin flip and were awarded the first overall pick, while the Portland Trail Blazers were awarded the second pick. The remaining first-round picks and the subsequent rounds were assigned to teams in reverse order of their win–loss record in the previous season. Prior to the draft, the Baltimore Bullets relocated to Landover, Maryland, and became the Capital Bullets. The Philadelphia 76ers were awarded an extra first-round draft pick as compensation when the Seattle SuperSonics signed John Brisker. A player who had finished his four-year college eligibility was eligible for selection. If a player left college early, he would not be eligible for selection until his college class graduated. Before the draft, 11 college underclassmen were declared eligible for selection under the "hardship" rule. These players had applied and gave evidence of financial hardship to the league, which granted them the right to start earning their living by starting their professional careers earlier. The draft consisted of 20 rounds comprising the selection of 211 players.

This was the last NBA draft to last until any number of rounds, or until teams run out of prospects; from the next year's draft until the 1984 draft they were fixed to 10 rounds.

Draft selections and draftee career notes
Doug Collins from Illinois State University was selected first overall by the Philadelphia 76ers. Jim Brewer from the University of Minnesota was second, taken by the Cleveland Cavaliers with a pick obtained from the Blazers in a trade. Ernie DiGregorio, from Providence College, was selected third by the Buffalo Braves, and went on to win the Rookie of the Year Award. George McGinnis, selected by the 76ers with the 22nd pick, is the only player from the 1973 draft who was selected to both the All-NBA Team and the All-Star Game. Collins, 5th pick Kermit Washington, and 50th pick Larry Kenon, are the only other players from this draft who were selected to an All-Star Game. Collins's achievements include four All-Star Game selections. After retiring as a player, he went on to coach the Chicago Bulls, the Detroit Pistons and the Washington Wizards. Brewer was a member of the 1982 NBA champion Los Angeles Lakers. He later played basketball in Europe, earning the 1983 Euroleague championship with the Ford Cantù. McGinnis had already played in the American Basketball Association (ABA) prior to the draft. He left college after his sophomore year in 1971 to play with the Indiana Pacers for four seasons. He later played in the NBA with the Philadelphia 76ers, the team that drafted him, after the ABA–NBA merger in 1976. He had one ABA Most Valuable Player Award, three ABA All-Star Game selections, three NBA All-Star Game selections, three All-ABA Team selections and two All-NBA Team selections. Kenon initially opted to play in the ABA, spending three seasons there before joining the NBA with the San Antonio Spurs when both leagues merged. He was selected to three ABA All-Star Games and two NBA All-Star Games.

Mike D'Antoni, the 20th pick, only played four seasons in the NBA and ABA before he moved to Italy with the Olimpia Milano. He played there for thirteen seasons and won five Italian league titles and two Euroleague titles. After retiring as a player, he coached Olimpia Milano and Benetton Treviso, leading the latter to two Italian league titles. He then returned to the NBA and coached three NBA teams. He won the Coach of the Year Award in 2005 with the Phoenix Suns and in 2017 with the Houston Rockets. M. L. Carr, the 76th pick, earned two NBA championships with the Boston Celtics in 1981 and 1984 as a player. Carr later became the Celtics' head coach for two seasons in the 1990s. Two other players drafted also went on to have coaching careers in the NBA: 21st pick Allan Bristow and 66th pick George Karl.

In the fifth round, the Los Angeles Lakers selected Krešimir Ćosić from Brigham Young University with the 84th pick. However, he opted to return to Yugoslavia after his college career. Ćosić had a successful career in Europe, winning numerous league and club titles, as well as six gold medals with the Yugoslavian national team. For his achievements, he has been inducted to the Basketball Hall of Fame. He has also been inducted by the International Basketball Federation (FIBA) to the FIBA Hall of Fame. The Atlanta Hawks used the 79th pick to draft Dave Winfield, who starred at both baseball and basketball at the University of Minnesota. He was also drafted in three other major sport leagues; Major League Baseball (MLB), the National Football League (NFL) and the ABA. He chose baseball and played 22 seasons in MLB.

Key

Draft

Other picks
The following list includes other draft picks who have appeared in at least one NBA game.

Notable undrafted players
These players were not selected in the 1973 draft but played at least one game in the NBA.

Trades
 On the draft-day, the Cleveland Cavaliers acquired a first-round pick and a third-round pick from the Portland Trail Blazers in exchange for John Johnson, Rick Roberson and Los Angeles Lakers' first-round pick. The Cavaliers used the picks to draft Jim Brewer and Jim O'Brien. The Blazers used the pick to draft Barry Parkhill.
 On October 13, 1971, the Los Angeles Lakers acquired a 1973 first-round pick, 1972 and 1973 second-round picks from the Cleveland Cavaliers in exchange for Rick Roberson. The Lakers used the picks to draft Kermit Washington and Bill Schaeffer.
 On April 13, 1973, the Atlanta Hawks acquired the ninth pick from the Detroit Pistons in exchange for George Trapp. The Hawks used the pick to draft Dwight Jones.
 On October 18, 1971, the Capital Bullets (as the Baltimore Bullets) acquired a second-round pick and Archie Clark from the Philadelphia 76ers in exchange for Fred Carter and Kevin Loughery. The Bullets used the pick to draft Louie Nelson.
 On November 9, 1972, the Kansas City-Omaha Kings acquired a second-round pick from the Detroit Pistons in exchange for John Mengelt. Previously, the Pistons acquired the pick on September 29, 1972, from the Buffalo Braves in exchange for Howard Komives. The Kings used the pick to draft Mike D'Antoni.
 On July 31, 1972, the Philadelphia 76ers acquired a second-round pick from the Portland Trail Blazers in exchange for Fred Foster. The 76ers used the pick to draft Allan Bristow.
 On April 18, 1973, the Philadelphia 76ers acquired a 1973 second-round pick from Seattle SuperSonics as a compensation when the Sonics signed John Brisker on August 15, 1972. The 76ers used the pick to draft George McGinnis.
 On June 9, 1971, the Chicago Bulls acquired a second-round pick from the Houston Rockets in exchange for Dick Gibbs. The Bulls used the pick to draft Kevin Stacom.
 On November 22, 1972, the Cleveland Cavaliers acquired a second-round pick from the Phoenix Suns in exchange for Walt Wesley. The Bulls used the pick to draft Allan Hornyak.
 On October 31, 1972, the Atlanta Hawks acquired a second-round pick from the Detroit Pistons in exchange for Don Adams. The Hawks used the pick to draft Tom Ingelsby.
 On October 9, 1972, the New York Knicks acquired a second-round pick from the Atlanta Hawks in exchange for Eddie Mast. The Bulls used the pick to draft Patrick McFarland.
 On December 6, 1972, the Los Angeles Lakers acquired a second-round pick from the Capital Bullets (as the Baltimore Bullets) in exchange for Flynn Robinson and future considerations. The Lakers used the pick to draft Jim Chones.
 On October 18, 1972, the Philadelphia 76ers acquired a second-round pick from the Chicago Bulls in exchange for Dennis Awtrey. Previously, the Bulls acquired the pick on December 10, 1971, from the New York Knicks in exchange for Charlie Paulk. The 76ers used the pick to draft Caldwell Jones.
 On October 10, 1972, the Phoenix Suns acquired a second-round pick from the Philadelphia 76ers in exchange for Mel Counts. Previously, the 76ers acquired the pick on the same day from the Milwaukee Bucks in exchange for Gary Gregor. The Suns used the pick to draft Gary Melchionni.
 On January 26, 1973, the Atlanta Hawks acquired a third-round pick from the Philadelphia 76ers in exchange for Jeff Halliburton. The Hawks used the pick to draft Ted Manakas.
 On December 27, 1971, the Phoenix Suns acquired a third-round pick from the Kansas City-Omaha Kings (as the Cincinnati Royals) in exchange for Fred Taylor. The Suns used the pick to draft Joe Reaves.
 The Detroit Pistons acquired a third-round pick from the Los Angeles Lakers as part of the 1969 trade for Happy Hairston.
 On December 9, 1971, the Houston Rockets acquired a third-round pick and Greg Smith from the Milwaukee Bucks in exchange for a 1972 first-round pick and Curtis Perry. The Rockets used the pick to draft E. C. Coleman.

Early entrants

College underclassmen
The following college basketball players successfully applied for an NBA hardship.

  Bird Averitt – G, Pepperdine (junior)
  Larry Harris – F, Genesee CC (sophomore)
  Dwight Jones – Houston (junior)
  Larry Kenon – F, Memphis (junior)
  Raymond Lewis – G, Cal State LA (sophomore)
  Arnold Mast – G, Oklahoma City Southwestern JC (freshman)
  Larry McNeill – F, Marquette (junior)
  John Williamson – G, New Mexico State (junior)

Notes

See also
 List of first overall NBA draft picks

References
General

Specific

External links
NBA.com
NBA.com: NBA Draft History

Draft
National Basketball Association draft
NBA draft
NBA draft
NBA draft
Basketball in New York City
Sporting events in New York City